The 2004 Boston College Eagles football team represented Boston College during the 2004 NCAA Division I-A football season. Boston College was a member of the Big East Conference. The Eagles played their home games in 2004 at Alumni Stadium in Chestnut Hill, Massachusetts, which has been their home stadium since 1957.

Schedule

References

Boston College
Boston College Eagles football seasons
Big East Conference football champion seasons
Duke's Mayo Bowl champion seasons
Lambert-Meadowlands Trophy seasons
Boston College Eagles football
Boston College Eagles football